Tracey Elizabeth Bregman is an American soap opera actress. She is best known for the role of Lauren Fenmore on The Young and the Restless and The Bold and the Beautiful.

Early life

Bregman was born May 29, 1963, in Munich, Germany to American musical arranger, record producer and composer Buddy Bregman and Canadian-born actress Suzanne Lloyd. She lived in Great Britain until the age of 10 when her family relocated to California. She has been acting since she was 11 years old, and currently resides in Malibu, California.

Career
Prior to The Young and the Restless, Bregman appeared on Days of Our Lives between 1978 and 1980, portraying troubled teen, Donna Temple Craig. She also appeared in the films Happy Birthday to Me (1981) and The Concrete Jungle (1982).

From April to June 2010, while still portraying Lauren, Bregman took on double-duty with The Young and the Restless, as she also portrayed Sheila Carter's sister, Sarah. When it was introduced in 1985, she was the first actress to be awarded the Daytime Emmy Award for Outstanding Younger Actress in a Drama Series (then known as the "Outstanding Ingenue in a Drama Series"), being nominated for the same award again in 1987 and for Outstanding Supporting Actress in a Drama Series in both 2006 and 2008. In, 2010, she also appeared alongside her Y&R co-star, Christian LeBlanc, in the music video for Reba McEntire's single, "I Keep On Loving You".

Bregman starred in the 2013 drama/thriller film Misogynist alongside Jonathan Bennett and Eve Mauro, earning a nomination for best actress at the Los Angeles Underground Film Festival.

Personal life and honors

Bregman was a vegetarian from an early age and now follows a vegan lifestyle.

Bregman married Ron Recht in 1987; the couple had two sons, Austin (born 1991) and Landon (born 1996). They divorced after 23 years of marriage in 2010.

On April 7, 2014, Bregman was inducted into the Ride of Fame and has a New York City double decker bus dedicated to her and her accomplishments.

Bregman lost her Malibu home to a wildfire in November 2018. 

Bregman is an active supporter and honorary board member for Chenoa Manor, an animal sanctuary in Chester County, Pennsylvania.

Selected filmography

Awards and nominations

References

External links

 Tracey E. Bregman profile from Y&R Online

Living people
21st-century American women
Actresses from California
American film actresses
American soap opera actresses
American television actresses
Daytime Emmy Award for Outstanding Younger Actress in a Drama Series winners
Daytime Emmy Award winners
German emigrants to the United States
Year of birth missing (living people)
People from Munich